Actin-related protein 2/3 complex subunit 2 is a protein that in humans is encoded by the ARPC2 gene.

Function 

This gene encodes one of seven subunits of the human Arp2/3 protein complex. The Arp2/3 protein complex has been implicated in the control of actin polymerization in cells and has been conserved through evolution. The exact role of the protein encoded by this gene, the p34 subunit, has yet to be determined. Two alternatively spliced variants have been characterized to date. Additional alternatively spliced variants have been described but their full length nature has not been determined.

Interactions 

ARPC2 has been shown to interact with Cortactin.

References

External links

Further reading

External links